Sphaerionotus is a genus of true crane fly.

Distribution
Indonesia & Malaysia.

Species
S. curtipennis de Meijere, 1919
S. fasciatus Edwards, 1928
S. vittatus Edwards, 1933

References

Tipulidae
Diptera of Asia